Tucuruí is a municipality in the state of Pará in the Northern region of Brazil.

The city is served by Tucuruí Airport.

The name Tucuruí is a Tupi word that means "river of ants" or "river of locusts". It's the concatenation of two tupi words: tukura (ants, locusts) and 'y (water).
The city is very famous because of its colossal Dam, the Tucuruí Dam which is administered by Eletrobrás Eletronorte – the constructor company of this large infrastructure project.

Economy
Currently, Tucuruí city's economy is based on agriculture and general commerce. During its 60 years the commerce activity varied a lot. In the beginning there was a railroad for draining out the production of the Brazil Nut (known in Brazil as "Pará's Nut"), a very abundant available product in the region. The Tucuruí Dam developed the municipality and brought large industries for the region.

Tourism

In Tucuruí, you can explore the dam lake, one of the largest artificial lakes ever made by man. You can visit islands, fishing Cichla or Tambaqui and see natural beauties that you can only find in Amazon. The historical site of city has old buildings and the Museum of Extinct Railroad - the historical museum with many pictures and objects from the city's beginning. There is a train that was used in the period of Brazil Nut that was restored and placed in front of the Eletrobás Eletronorte Cultural Center. Inside the Cultural Center, visits to the inside the hydroelectric dam to see its workings are scheduled. In February there is the Tucuruí carnival party, one of the most known in region. In June, there is the Tucunaré's festival (Cichla Festival), when traditional preparations of fish are served.

Gastronomy
Tucuruí has a privileged lake with many species of fish. Naturally, the local gastronomy has much fish in it. The most known is the Peixe no Saco (Fish in the Bag). The Peixe no Saco is a preparation of Chichla or Tambaqui with a wide variety of spices and herbs placed within the fish's stomach. The fish is then placed on a special waterproof bag with soy sauce and roasted in oven or in firewood.

Other gastronomic options include indigenous food. There is the Tacacá (a broth made of tucupi, jambu [a native variety of paracress], starch and shrimp served in a gourd usually to drink without spoon or fork. There is just a toothpick for eating the shrimp and the herbs) and the Vatapá and maniçoba.

Airport 
Tucuruí airport is located about  far from the city. It is currently only served by Azul Brazilian Airlines.

See also 
 List of municipalities in Pará

References 

Municipalities in Pará